Heinz Allenspach (22 February 1928 – 16 September 2022) was a Swiss editor and politician. A member of the Free Democratic Party of Switzerland, he served in the National Council from 1979 to 1995.

Allenspach died on 16 September 2022, at the age of 94.

References

 
1928 births
2022 deaths
Free Democratic Party of Switzerland politicians
Members of the National Council (Switzerland)
University of St. Gallen alumni
People from St. Gallen (city)